Iolaus ismenias, the white sapphire, is a butterfly in the family Lycaenidae. It is found in Senegal, Guinea-Bissau, Burkina Faso, Ivory Coast, Ghana, Togo, Nigeria, Cameroon, the Democratic Republic of the Congo, Sudan, Uganda and Ethiopia. The habitat consists of dry savanna.

The larvae feed on Loranthus species.

Subspecies
Iolaus ismenias ismenias (Senegal, Guinea-Bissau, Burkina Faso, Ivory Coast, Ghana, Togo, northern Nigeria, northern Cameroon, Democratic Republic of the Congo, southern Sudan, Uganda)
Iolaus ismenias piaggiae Oberthür, 1883 (Ethiopia)

References

External links

Die Gross-Schmetterlinge der Erde 13: Die Afrikanischen Tagfalter. Plate XIII 68 d

Butterflies described in 1834
Iolaus (butterfly)